Sukullu (Aymara for a baby boy for whom a certain traditional rite was celebrated in the main square together with the other children who were born in the same year, Hispanicized spelling Sucullo) is a   mountain in the Chunta mountain range in the Andes of Peru. It is located in the Huancavelica Region, Castrovirreyna Province, on the border of the districts of Aurahuá and Castrovirreyna.

References

Mountains of Huancavelica Region
Mountains of Peru